Highway 299 (AR 299, Ark. 299, and Hwy. 299) is a north–south state highway in Arkansas. The route of  runs from Interstate 30 to AR 24 in White Oak Lake State Park. The route is two–lane, undivided.

Route description
Highway 299 begins at Interstate 30 in Hemsptead County. The route runs south to intersect Highway 174 before turning east toward Emmet. In Emmet the route has a  overlap with US 67 before continuing east into Nevada County. The route has a short concurrency with Highway 53 and then US 371 near Laneburg. East of this overlap the route serves as a terminus for Highway 372 and later Highway 200 before entering White Oak Lake State Park. After an intersection with Highway 387 the route terminates at Highway 24. The route was most recently paved when a segment in Nevada County was resurfaced 1975, with all portions last receiving paving prior to that project.

History
The portions from Emmet-Highway 53 and from Highway 24-White Oak Lake State Park (at the time the Arkansas State Nursery) were added to the state highway system on April 24, 1963. The discontinuous segments were connected on June 23, 1965.

Major intersections

|-
| colspan=3 align=center |  concurrency north, 
|
|-

|-
| colspan=4 align=center |  concurrency north, 
|
|-
|-
| colspan=4 align=center |  concurrency south, 
|
|-

See also

 List of state highways in Arkansas

References

External links

299
Transportation in Hempstead County, Arkansas
Transportation in Nevada County, Arkansas